The 2014–15 season was Oxford United's fifth season in League Two after returning from the Conference, and their first under new manager Michael Appleton. They finished 13th in the table, following an 8th-place finish in League Two in 2013–14.

In July 2014, private equity broker Darryl Eales took over the club from previous owner Ian Lenagan and installed Mark Ashton as Chief Executive and former Portsmouth, Blackpool and Blackburn Rovers manager Michael Appleton as head coach. The new management team had little time to assemble a side, with Danny Hylton (signed by outgoing manager Gary Waddock to replace long-serving forward James Constable) the only new player among the first-team squad at the time of the takeover. The season opened badly: a series of four narrow defeats left United pointless and at the foot of the League Two table and fearing a second relegation to non-League football. Matters gradually improved, but the team never reached the top half of the table and calls were heard during the season for Appleton's dismissal. An unbeaten run of eight games (including five wins) at the end of the season eased relegation fears and led to a 13th-place finish, the club's highest position during the season. This late upturn, alongside the solid strike record of leading scorer Hylton and the performances of loanees Tyrone Barnett and Kemar Roofe (the latter to sign permanently after the season ended), gave cause for optimism for the following season, and dampened criticism of what was ultimately an underwhelming season.

United beat Grimsby Town of the National League in the first round of the  FA Cup, but were eliminated by fellow League Two side Tranmere Rovers after a second-round replay. After an eye-catching first-round away victory over higher-division opposition in the shape of eventual League One champions Bristol City, the club were narrowly eliminated from the League Cup in the second round, losing 7–6 on penalties to Premier League side West Bromwich Albion after a hard-fought 1–1 draw at The Hawthorns. Oxford fell at the first hurdle in the Football League Trophy, losing to Cheltenham Town in the first round.

It was the club's 121st year in existence, their 115th of competitive football and their 66th since turning professional. This article covers the period from 1 July 2014 to 30 June 2015.

Team kit

Match fixtures and results

Pre-season

League Two

League table

Results
The fixtures for the 2014–15 season were announced on 18 June 2014 at 9am.

Results summary

Results by round

FA Cup

The draw for the first round of the FA Cup was made on 27 October 2014.

League Cup

The draw for the first round was made on 17 June 2014 at 10am. Oxford United were drawn away to Bristol City.

Football League Trophy

Squad statistics

Appearances and goals

Top scorers

Disciplinary record

Transfers

References

2014-15
2014–15 Football League Two by team